The Black Box is a 2005 French mystery film directed by Richard Berry, written by Berry and Éric Assous, adapted from a novella by Tonino Benacquista, and starring José Garcia and Marion Cotillard.

Plot
Following a car accident, in which he believes he killed a boy, Arthur Seligman falls into a coma for several hours.  While in the coma, he pronounces incoherent sentences. At his awakening, he does not remember what happened before the crash, and he does not know the meaning of the words he pronounced while unconscious. The nurse who assisted him, Isabelle Kruger, recorded them in a notebook, which she gives to him. Arthur then tries to understand what happened, what those sentences mean, and begins to lose his grasp of reality.

Cast
José Garcia as  Arthur Seligman
Marion Cotillard as Isabelle Kruger / Alice
Michel Duchaussoy as Mr. Seligman
Bernard Le Coq as  Walcott / Doctor Granger
Helena Noguerra as Soraya
Gérald Laroche as  Commissioner Marc Koskas
 as  Mrs. Seligman
 as  Dr. Brenner
Thomas Chabrol as Thierry
Pascal Bongard as Clovis
Marilou Berry as The desk clerk
Lise Lamétrie as The guardian

References

External links

2005 films
2005 thriller films
French mystery thriller films
2000s mystery thriller films
Films directed by Richard Berry
Films scored by Nathaniel Méchaly
2000s French films